Redouane Akniouene (born 15 January 1982) is an Algerian footballer who plays for CR Belouizdad in Algeria.

National team statistics

External links 
 

1982 births
Living people
Algerian footballers
Algeria international footballers
CA Bordj Bou Arréridj players
Algerian Ligue Professionnelle 1 players
CR Belouizdad players
OMR El Annasser players
Footballers from Algiers
Association football defenders
21st-century Algerian people